Rain Bird Corporation is an international privately held manufacturer and provider of irrigation products and services for landscapes, golf courses, sports fields, and agriculture which are designed to minimize water consumption. The firm is headquartered in Azusa, California, with offices and manufacturing facilities in Tucson, Arizona; Steele, Alabama; Mexico; France; and China. Rain Bird sells its products and services in over 130 countries.

History
Rain Bird had its origins in 1933 when Glendora, California, citrus grower Orton Englehart developed the first prototype of the horizontal action impact sprinkler. This new design offered slow rotation and more efficient watering than other sprinklers of that era, features that were long sought after by local irrigators. Orton's friend and neighbor Clement LaFetra began helping him build and market the sprinklers, and they urged him to patent the invention.   was awarded on April 16, 1935. Englehart preferred farming, so in 1935, he sold the business to Clement and Mary Elizabeth LaFetra, whose descendants operated the company until January 2022.

The name Rain Bird was taken from the Native American legend of a bird that brought rain, in reference to the bird-like appearance of the impact sprinkler in action. Since its beginnings, the firm has offered irrigation products for farms, golf courses, sports arenas, commercial developments, and residential landscapes. Rain Bird has obtained over 450 patents since its founding.

Recognition
The Rain Bird horizontal action impact-drive sprinkler head was recognized as a historic landmark of agricultural engineering in 1990 by the American Society of Agricultural and Biological Engineers. This invention led to sprinkler irrigation development that currently exceeds  worldwide.

In 2015, the firm was recognized by National Business Research Institute with its prestigious Circle of Excellence award, based upon its outstanding employee engagement.

References

External links
 Rain Bird Corporation
 
 

Irrigation
Companies based in Los Angeles County, California
Manufacturing companies established in 1933
Companies based in Tucson, Arizona
1933 establishments in California